South Loon Lake is a community of the Halifax Regional Municipality in the Canadian province of Nova Scotia in the Musquodoboit Valley.

References
 Explore HRM

Communities in Halifax, Nova Scotia